The men's 100 metres at the 2017 World Para Athletics Championships was held at the Olympic Stadium in London from 14 to 23 July.

Medalists

Events listed in pink were contested but no medals were awarded.

Results

T11
Round 1

Final

T12
Round 1

Semifinals

Final

T13
Round 1

Final

T33
Final

T34
Round 1

Final

T35
Final

T36
Round 1

Final

T37
Round 1

Final

T38
Round 1

Final

T42
Round 1

Final

T44
Round 1

Final

T47
Round 1

Final

T51
Final

T52
Round 1

Final

T53
Round 1

Final

T54
Round 1

Final

See also
List of IPC world records in athletics

References

100 metres
2017 in men's athletics
100 metres at the World Para Athletics Championships